= RNA, 18S ribosomal =

Ribosomal RNA in the species Homo sapiens

An Error has occurred retrieving Wikidata item for infobox

RNA, 18S ribosomal is a protein that in humans is encoded by the LOC109910383 gene.
